Pichjajocha (possibly from Quechua pichqa five, cocha lake) is a mountain in the Andes of Peru, about  high. It is situated in the Ayacucho Region, Lucanas Province, on the border of the districts of Carmen Salcedo and Chipao, southeast of Andamarca.

References 

Mountains of Peru
Mountains of Ayacucho Region